Caravelí is a town in Southern Peru. It is the capital of the province Caravelí, in the region Arequipa.
 
Its Catedral San Pedro, dedicated to Saint Peter, is the seat of the pre-diocesan Territorial Prelature of Caravelí.

References

External links 
 GCatholic - Caraveli's San Pedro cathedral

Populated places in the Arequipa Region